One/Three is the first album released by American electronic musician Tadd Mullinix, under the name Dabrye.

Track listing

 "The Lish" – (3:57)
 "We've Got Commodity" – (2:35)
 "With a Professional" – (3:51)
 "I'm Missing You" – (3:47)
 "How Many Times (With This)" – (3:51)
 "Truffle No Shuffle" – (3:28)
 "Hyped-Up Plus Tax" – (3:39)
 "Smoking the Edge" – (3:15)
 "So Scientific" – (3:52)
 "Hot Mating Ritual" – (3:12)

2001 debut albums
Dabrye albums
Ghostly International albums